Nesat "Neti" Meçe (born 8 November 1995) is an Albanian professional footballer who plays as a midfielder for Greek Super League 2 club Niki Volos.

Club career

Early career

Niki Volos

International career

Career statistics

Club

References

External links

1995 births
Living people
People from Ersekë
Albanian emigrants to Greece
Albanian footballers
Albanian expatriate footballers
Albania under-21 international footballers
Association football midfielders
Niki Volos F.C. players
A.E. Karaiskakis F.C. players
Super League Greece players
Gamma Ethniki players
Super League Greece 2 players
Football League (Greece) players
Expatriate footballers in Greece
Albanian expatriate sportspeople in Greece